East Meets West is a 1936 British drama film directed by Herbert Mason and starring George Arliss, Lucie Mannheim, Godfrey Tearle and John Laurie. It was made at the Lime Grove Studios in London. The film's art direction was by Oscar Friedrich Werndorff.

Plot
A small Middle Eastern state is coveted by the major powers for strategic reasons.

Cast
 George Arliss - Sultan of Rungay
 Lucie Mannheim - Marguerite Carter
 Godfrey Tearle - Sir Henry Mallory
 Romney Brent - Doctor Shagu
 Ballard Berkeley - Nazim
 Ronald Ward - Neville Carter
 Norma Varden - Lady Mallory
 John Laurie - Doctor Fergusson
 O. B. Clarence - Osmin
 Campbell Gullan - Veka
 Eliot Makeham - Goodson
 Peter Gawthorne - Stanton
 Ralph Truman - Abdul
 Patrick Barr - O'Flaherty 
 Peter Croft - Crowell

Reception
Writing for The Spectator in 1936, Graham Greene gave the film a very poor review, succinctly warning readers "to avoid [it] like the plague".

References

Bibliography
 Low, Rachael. Filmmaking in 1930s Britain. George Allen & Unwin, 1985.
 Wood, Linda. British Films, 1927-1939. British Film Institute, 1986.

External links

 East Meets West at Park Circus
 East Meets West at BFI
 East Meets West at Rotten Tomatoes

1936 films
1930s English-language films
Films directed by Herbert Mason
1936 drama films
British drama films
Films shot at Lime Grove Studios
Gainsborough Pictures films
British black-and-white films
1930s British films